An emirate is a territory ruled by an emir, a title used by monarchs or high officeholders in the Muslim world. From a historical point of view, an emirate is a political-religious unit smaller than a caliphate. It can be considered equivalent to a principality in non-Muslim contexts.

Currently in the world, there are two emirates that are independent states (Kuwait, and Qatar), one state ruled by an unrecognised emirate (Afghanistan) and a state that consists of a federation of seven emirates, the United Arab Emirates. A great number of previously independent emirates around the world are now part of larger states, as can be seen in Nigeria.

Etymology
Etymologically, emirate or amirate is the quality, dignity, office, or territorial competence of any emir (prince, commander, governor, etc.).

Types

Monarchies
The United Arab Emirates is a federal state that comprises seven federal emirates, each administered by a hereditary emir, these seven forming the electoral college for the federation's president and prime minister.

As most emirates have either disappeared, been integrated in a larger modern state, or changed their rulers' styles, e.g. to malik (Arabic for "king") or sultan, such true emirate-states have become rare.

Provinces
Furthermore, in Arabic the term can be generalized to mean any province of a country that is administered by a member of the ruling class, especially of a member (usually styled emir) of the royal family, as in Saudi Arabian governorates.

List of present emirates

Current emirates with political autonomy are listed below:

Arabian Peninsula
 (since 14 May 1961)
 (since 3 December 1971)
 (since 2 December 1971):

South Asia
 (since 15 August 2021; unrecognized)

List of former and integrated emirates
These are the emirates that have either ceased to exist, are not recognized and hold no real power, or were integrated into another country and preserved as "traditional states". They are arranged by location and in order of the date of the first leader styled "emir."

Africa

North Africa
Emirate of Nekor, Rif region of modern Morocco 710–1019
Emirate of Ifriqiya, Aghlabid Ifriqiya within modern Tunisia, Algeria, Sicily, Morocco, and Libya 800–909
Emirate of Tunis, Hafsid Ifriqiya within modern Tunisia, Algeria, and Libya 1229–1574
Zab Emirate, modern Algeria circa 1400 (short-lived)
Emirate of Trarza, modern southwest Mauritania 1640s–1910s
Emirate of Cyrenaica, modern eastern Libya 1949–1951 (became the Kingdom of Libya)

Sub-Saharan Africa

Ethiopia
Emirate of Harar, eastern Ethiopia 1647–1887

Ghana
Zabarma Emirate, northeastern Ghana 1860s–1897

Niger
Emirate of Say, southwestern Niger 19th century– (integrated)

Nigeria

Fika Emirate, northeastern Nigeria 15th century– (integrated)
Gwandu Emirate, northwestern Nigeria 15th century to 2005 (integrated and then deposed)
Kebbi Emirate, northwestern Nigeria 1516– (integrated)
Borgu Emirate, westcentral Nigeria, formed from Bussa Emirate 1730–1954 and Kaiama Emirate 1912–54, unified 1954– (integrated)
Gumel Emirate, northcentral Nigeria 1749– (integrated)
Yauri Emirate, northwestern Nigeria 1799– (integrated)
Gombe Emirate, northeast Nigeria 1804– (integrated)
Kano Emirate, northcentral Nigeria 1805– (integrated)
Bauchi Emirate, northeast Nigeria 1805– (integrated)
Daura Emirate, northcentral Nigeria off and on 1805– (integrated)
Katagum Emirate, northcentral Nigeria 1807– (integrated)
Zaria Emirate, northcentral Nigeria 1808– (integrated)
Potiskum Emirate, northeastern Nigeria 1809– (integrated)
Adamawa Emirate, eastern Nigeria and formerly into western Cameroon 1809– (integrated where preserved)
Ilorin Emirate, southwestern Nigeria 1817– (integrated)
Muri Emirate, eastcentral Nigeria 1817– (integrated)
Kazaure Emirate, northcentral Nigeria 1819– (integrated)
Lapai Emirate, central Nigeria 1825– (integrated)
Suleja Emirate, central Nigeria 1828– (integrated)
Agaie Emirate, westcentral Nigeria 1832– (integrated)
Bida Emirate, westcentral Nigeria 1856– (integrated)
Kontagora Emirate, northcentral Nigeria 1858– (integrated)
Borno Emirate, northeastern Nigeria 1900– (integrated)
Dikwa Emirate, northeast Nigeria 1901– (integrated)
Biu Emirate, northeast Nigeria 1920– (integrated)

Asia

Arabia
 Emirate of Mecca, Western Arabia  967–1916
Uyunid Emirate, the modern Arabian Peninsula 1076–1253
 Jabrids Emirate, Eastern and center Arabia 1417–1524
 Emirate of Al-Uyaynah central Arabia 1446–1760
 Bani Khalid Emirate, Eastern Arabia 1669–1796
Emirate of Beihan, modern southern Yemen 1680–1967
Emirate of Diriyah, mainly in modern Saudi Arabia and the UAE 1727–1818
Emirate of Nejd, center and eastern Arabia 1818–91
Emirate of Dhala, modern southern Yemen early 19th century to 1967
Emirate of Jabal Shammar, northcentral Arabia 1836–1921
Emirate of Nejd and Hasa, central Arabia 1902–21
Idrisid Emirate of Asir, Jizan in modern southwestern Saudi Arabia 1906–34
Emirate of Bahrain, 1971–2002 (before it was under a hakim; after under a malik)
Emirates of Saudi Arabia, the thirteen provinces of Saudi Arabia

Central Asia
Emirate of Bukhara, modern Uzbekistan 1785–1920
Khotan Emirate, 1933 northwest China, merged into First East Turkestan Republic

South Asia
Emirate of Afghanistan, Afghanistan 1823–1929
Islamic Emirate of Afghanistan (1996–2001), first period of Taliban rule in Afghanistan (overthrown)
Islamic Emirate of Kunar, southern Afghanistan 1991–1991
Emirate of Multan
Habbarid Emirate

Near East
Emirate of Mosul (see list of emirs for more), modern Iraq 905–1096, 1127–1222, 1254–1383, 1758–1918
Emirate of Melitene, modern central Turkey mid-ninth century to 934
Emirate of Amida, modern Eastern Turkey 983–1085
Karaman Emirate, south-central Anatolia 1250–1487
Emirate of Aydin, state composed of Oghuz Turks in modern Turkey from the early 14th century to 1390
Emirate of Dulkadir, modern Eastern Turkey 1337–1522
Emirate of Ramazan, modern Eastern Turkey 1352–1608
Timurid Emirates, Timur's empire and the minor emirates left behind after the fall of the Timurid dynasty in the Middle East, 1526-c.1550
Soran Emirate, modern northern Iraq 1816–35
Az Zubayr, town in Basra Governorate, Iraq during 16th century
Emirate of Transjordan, modern Jordan 1921–46
Islamic Emirate of Byara, modern Kurdistan Region, Iraq, 2001–2003

Europe

Caucasus
 The Emirate of Armenia, Caucasus 637–884
 Emirate of Darband, Azerbaijan 869–1075
 Emirate of Tbilisi, modern Georgia 736–1080, nominally to 1122
 North Caucasian Emirate, Chechnya and Dagestan in the Caucasus 1919–1920
 Caucasus Emirate, Caucasus 2007–2017 (unrecognized)

Iberia
Emirate of Córdoba, modern Spain and Portugal 756–929 (title changed to caliph in 929)
Emirate of Badajoz, modern Portugal and western Spain 1009–1151
Emirate of Almería, region of Almería and Cartagena in modern Spain off and on 1013–1091
Emirate of Jerez, towns of Jerez de la Frontera and Arcos de la Frontera in modern southern Spain 1145–1147
Emirate of Granada, modern southern Spain 1228–1492

Mediterranean region
Emirate of Crete, Crete, modern Greece, 824 or 827/828 to 961
Emirate of Bari, city of Bari in southern Italy 847–871
Emirate of Malta, 870–1091
Emirate of Sicily, Sicily 965–1072
Emirate of QaTanSáar,city of Catanzaro in southern Italy 903-1050

See also 
 Caliphate
 Khanate

References

 
Feudalism
Monarchy